Unsquare is a 2008 studio album by Maybe Monday, a San Francisco based experimental electroacoustic improvisation music ensemble featuring guitarist Fred Frith, koto player Miya Masaoka and saxophonist Larry Ochs. It is their third album and includes guest musicians Gerry Hemingway, Carla Kihlstedt, Ikue Mori and Zeena Parkins. Unsquare was recorded at East Side Sound Studio in New York City on November 18, 2006, and was released by Intakt Records in Switzerland in January 2008.

Reception

In a review of Unsquare at All About Jazz, Kurt Gottschalk called Maybe Monday "a ridiculously strong trio", and described their collaboration with Hemingway, Kihlstedt, Mori and Parkins on this album as "a dizzying, fascinating set of music". Clifford Allen wrote at Bagatellen that Maybe Monday are not unlike the British free improvisation group AMM. He noted that which instruments are producing which sound is not important – it is the combination of those sounds that matters, the "subsuming of the parts to the whole". Allen added that "to parse Unsquare would be a disservice to the breadth of its canvas – this is a very rich recording of electro-acoustic improvisation." Jason Bivins wrote in Cadence that the inclusion of the four guests "unsettl[ed] the group in just the right ways and thicken[ed] the sound provocatively". He was impressed that they did this "without weighing the music down or sacrificing space". Bivins described Unsquare as a "very fine record".

Reviewing Unsquare in DownBeat, Bill Shoemaker was initially concerned that the presence of guests on Maybe Monday's third album would upset the "alluringly precarious elegance and intensity" of their earlier work. But he was pleased at how "keenly ensemble-minded" the guests are, and that they appear to have "infallible instincts for when less is more and when more is much more". The album's pieces "pivot between sparseness and density, altering a consistently bracing mix of acoustic and electronic elements". Shoemaker felt that the way the instruments connect, "the twacks of koto and low-register harp; the gravelly drones of guitar and laptop; the smudges of reeds and bowed strings", explains the growing interest in electro-acoustic improvisation.

Track listing
All tracks composed by Maybe Monday.

Sources: Liner notes, Discogs.

Personnel
Fred Frith – electric guitar
Miya Masaoka – 25 string koto, electronics
Larry Ochs – sopranino and tenor saxophones
Guests
Gerry Hemingway – drums, percussion, voice
Carla Kihlstedt – electric and acoustic violins
Ikue Mori – electronics
Zeena Parkins – electric harp, electronics 

Sources: Liner notes, Discogs.

Sound and artwork
Recorded at East Side Sound Studio, New York City on November 18, 2006
Mixed at Ruminator Audio, San Francisco
Mastered at Headless Buddha Mastering Lab, Oakland, California
Marc Urselli – engineer
Monte Vallier – mixing
Larry Ochs – mixing, producer, liner notes
Myles Boisen – mastering
Intakt Records – producer
Emilie Clark – cover art
Jonas Schoder – graphic design

Sources: Liner notes, Discogs.

References

External links
Unsquare at Intakt Records
Unsquare reviews at Intakt Records

2008 albums
Free improvisation albums
Intakt Records albums
Fred Frith albums